Play School or Playschool may refer to:

Television
 Play School (British TV series), a BBC production aimed at preschool children
 Play School (Australian TV series), an Australian Broadcasting Corporation production based on the British version
 Play School (New Zealand TV series), a New Zealand version based on the BBC original

Other
 Playskool, a toy company
 Pre-school playgroup
 Preschool